The following is an alphabetical list of articles related to the U.S. state of California.

0–9 

.ca.us – Internet second-level domain for the state of California
33rd parallel north
34th parallel north
35th parallel north
36th parallel north
37th parallel north
38th parallel north
39th parallel north
40th parallel north
41st parallel north
42nd parallel north
100 km isolated peaks of California
115th meridian west
116th meridian west
117th meridian west
118th meridian west
119th meridian west
120th meridian west
121st meridian west
122nd meridian west
123rd meridian west
124th meridian west
1500 meter prominent peaks of California
4000 meter peaks of California
14,000-foot peaks of California

A
Adjacent states:

ACEC California
Agriculture of California
Airports in California
Alta California, 1804–1846
Amusement parks in California
An Act for the Admission of the State of California
:Category:Aquaria in California
:Category:Arboreta in California
commons:Category:Arboreta in California
Archaeology of California
:Category:Archaeological sites in California
commons:Category:Archaeological sites in California
Architecture of California
Architecture of the California missions
Art museums and galleries in California
commons:Category:Art museums and galleries in California
Area codes in California
Astronomical observatories in California
commons:Category:Astronomical observatories in California
Attorney General of the State of California

B
Bay Area Coalition for Equitable Schools
Beaches of California
commons:Category:Beaches of California
Benicia, California, state capital 1853-1854
Bernstein's Fish Grotto
Botanical gardens in California
commons:Category:Botanical gardens in California
budget crisis, California
Buildings and structures in California
commons:Category:Buildings and structures in California

C

CA – United States Postal Service postal code for the state of California
Califa Library Group
California  website
:Category:California
commons:Category:California
commons:Category:Maps of California
California Alpine Club
California Autism Foundation
California Border Police Initiative
California Children's Services
California Complete Count Committee
California English
California Fair Pay Act
California Festival of Beers
California Firearm Violence Research Center
California flood of 1605
California Gold Rush, 1848–1855
California in the American Civil War, 1861–1865
California Latino Leadership Fund
California locations by per capita income
California Low Cost Auto Insurance Program
California Military Institute
California National University for Advanced Studies
California Northern Magazine
California Outside Music Association
California Proposition 18 (1958)
California Reading List
California Rehabilitation Institute
California Senate Bill 535 (2012)
California Social Security Fairness Act of 2013
California State Employees Association
California State Retirees
California Supplemental Exam
California Trail, 1848–1869
California University of Business and Technology
The California Wine Club
Cannabis in California
Capital of the State of California
Capitol of the State of California
commons:Category:California State Capitol
Casinos in California
Caves of California
commons:Category:Caves of California
Census statistical areas of California
Central Coast of California
Central Valley of California
Cities in California
commons:Category:Cities in California
Climate of California
Climate change in California 
Colleges and universities in California
commons:Category:Universities and colleges in California
Communications in California
commons:Category:Communications in California
Colorado River

Companies in California
:Category:Companies based in California
Congressional districts of California
Constitution of the State of California
Convention centers in California
commons:Category:Convention centers in California
Counties of the state of California
commons:Category:Counties in California
County highway routes in California
Crime in California
Cuisine of California
California cuisine
Culture of California
:Category:California culture
commons:Category:California culture

D
Death Valley
Demographics of California
:Category:Demographics of California
Domestic partnership in California

E
Ecology of California
Economy of California
:Category:Economy of California
commons:Category:Economy of California
Education in California
:Category:Education in California
commons:Category:Education in California
El Camino Real
El Pueblo de San José de Guadalupe, state capital 1850-1852
Elections in the state of California
:Category:California elections
commons:Category:California elections
Energy in California
Environment of California
commons:Category:Environment of California

F

Festivals in California
commons:Category:Festivals in California
Flag of the state of California
Forts in California
:Category:Forts in California
commons:Category:Forts in California
Foster Park Bowl
Metropolitan Fresno

G

Gambling in California
Gardens in California
commons:Category:Gardens in California
Geography of California
:Category:Geography of California
commons:Category:Geography of California
Geology of California
commons:Category:Geology of California
Ghost towns in California
:Category:Ghost towns in California
commons:Category:Ghost towns in California
Gold mining in California
Golf clubs and courses in California
Government of the state of California  website
:Category:Government of California
commons:Category:Government of California
Governor of the State of California
List of governors of California
Great Seal of the State of California
Gyro's 3D Fear Factory

H
Heritage railroads in California
commons:Category:Heritage railroads in California
High schools of California
Higher education in California
Highest major peaks of California
Highway routes in California
Hiking trails in California
commons:Category:Hiking trails in California
History of California
Historical outline of California
History of California wine
History of California bread
:Category:History of California
commons:Category:History of California
Healthcare in California
Hospitals in California

I
Images of California
commons:Category:California
Inland Empire of Southern California
Interstate highway routes in California
Islands of California

J
 Johnson, John

K
 Kenny, California

L
Lakes in California
:Category:Lakes of California
commons:Category:Lakes of California
Landmarks in California
commons:Category:Landmarks in California
Languages in California
Law in California
Lieutenant Governor of the State of California
Lists related to the state of California:
List of airports in California
List of annual foot races in California
List of areas protected by the California Department of Fish and Game
List of ballot propositions in California
List of ballot propositions in California 1970–1979
List of birds in California
List of botanical gardens and arboretums in California
List of California wildfires
List of census statistical areas in California
List of cemeteries in California
List of cities, places, and neighborhoods in California
List of cities in California
List of cities in California by population
List of city nicknames in California
List of largest census-designated places in California
List of locations in California by per capita income
List of places in California
List of colleges and universities in California
List of companies based in California
List of counties in California
List of county name etymologies in California
List of county sheriffs in California
List of dams and reservoirs in California
List of district attorneys in California
List of forts in California
List of governors of California
List of high schools in California
List of highest points in California by county
List of highway routes in California
List of hospitals in California
List of individuals executed in California
List of Interstate highway routes in California
List of lakes in California
List of law enforcement agencies in California
List of lieutenant governors of California
List of mammals in California
List of mountain ranges of California
List of mountains of California
List of 4000 meter peaks of California
List of mountain peaks of California
List of mountain passes in California
List of movies set in Los Angeles
List of museums in California
List of National Historic Landmarks in California
List of newspapers in California
List of Ohlone villages
List of oldest schools in California
List of people associated with the California Gold Rush
List of people from California
List of power stations in California
List of pre-statehood governors of California
List of professional sports teams in California
List of protected areas within California
List of radio stations in California
List of railroads in California
List of regions of California
List of Registered Historic Places in California
List of reptiles in California
List of reservoirs and dams in California
List of rivers of California
List of school districts in California
List of school districts in California by county
List of Sierra Nevada topics
List of sister cities in California
List of speakers of the California State Assembly
List of state agencies in California
List of state beaches of California
List of state forests in California
List of state highways in California
List of state historic parks of California
List of state parks in California
List of state prisons in California
List of symbols of the state of California
List of telephone area codes in California
List of television shows set in Los Angeles
List of television shows set in San Francisco
List of television stations in California
List of United States congressional delegations from California
List of United States congressional districts in California
List of United States representatives from California
List of United States senators from California
List of urbanized areas in California by population
List of wine producing regions
Los Angeles, California
Greater Los Angeles
Los Angeles-Long Beach-Santa Ana, CA Metropolitan Statistical Area

M
commons:Category:Maps of California
Maritime history of California
Mass media in California
Missionary Church of the Disciples of Jesus Christ
Monterey, California, capital of California 1777–1804, capital of Alta California 1804–1846, capital of U.S. military government of California 1846–1849, capital of provisional government of California 1849-1850
Monument House
Monuments and memorials in California
commons:Category:Monuments and memorials in California
Mountain peaks of California
The 25 Highest major peaks of California
The 16 4000 meter peaks of California
The 25 Most prominent peaks of California
The 9 Ultra prominent peaks of California
The 25 Most isolated major peaks of California
The 9 100 km isolated peaks of California
:Category:Mountains of California
commons:Category:Mountains of California
Museums in California
:Category:Museums in California
commons:Category:Museums in California
Music of California
commons:Category:Music of California
:Category:Musical groups from California
:Category:Musicians from California

N
National Forests of California
commons:Category:National Forests of California
 Native Daughters of the Golden West
 Native Sons of the Golden West
Natural gas pipelines in California
Natural history of California
commons:Category:Natural history of California
Nature centers in California
commons:Category:Nature centers in California
NatureBridge
New Reform Magazine
Newspapers of California
Northern California
Nueva California

O
Outdoor sculptures in California
commons:Category:Outdoor sculptures in California
Outline of California

P
People from California
:Category:People from California
commons:Category:People from California
:Category:People by city in California
Places in California
Politics of California
:Category:Politics of California
commons:Category:Politics of California
Presidio Reál de San Carlos de Monterey, capital of Las Californias 1777–1804, capital of Alta California 1804-1846
Professional sports teams in California
Protected areas of California
:Category:Protected areas of California
commons:Category:Protected areas of California

Q
 Quinn, Isaac

R
Radio stations in California
Rail transport in California since 1856
Railroad museums in California
commons:Category:Railroad museums in California
Railroads in California
Ranchos of California
Registered historic places in California
commons:Category:Registered Historic Places in California
Religion in California
:Category:Religion in California
commons:Category:Religion in California
Renewable energy in California
Repopulation of wolves in California
Rivers of California
commons:Category:Rivers of California
Riverside, California
Riverside-San Bernardino-Ontario, CA Metropolitan Statistical Area
Rock formations in California
commons:Category:Rock formations in California
Roller coasters in California
commons:Category:Roller coasters in California

S
Sacramento, California, state capital since 1854
Sacramento metropolitan area
Salton Sea
Salton Trough
Salton Sink
Same-sex marriage in California
San Diego, California
San Diego-Carlsbad-San Marcos, CA Metropolitan Statistical Area
San Francisco, California
San Francisco Bay Area
San Jose, California, state capital 1850-1852
Silicon Valley
School districts of California
Scouting in California
Settlements in California
Cities in California
Census Designated Places in California
Other unincorporated communities in California
List of ghost towns in California
List of places in California
Sister cities in California
Ski areas and resorts in California
commons:Category:Ski areas and resorts in California
Solar power in California
Southern California
Spanish missions in California
Sports in California
List of professional sports teams in California
:Category:Sports in California
commons:Category:Sports in California
:Category:Sports venues in California
commons:Category:Sports venues in California
State Assembly of California
State Capitol of California
State highway routes in California
State of California  website
Constitution of the State of California
Government of the State of California
:Category:Government of California
commons:Category:Government of California
Executive branch of the government of the state of California
Governor of the State of California
Legislative branch of the government of the state of California
Legislature of the State of California
State Senate of California
State Assembly of California
Judicial branch of the government of the state of California
Supreme Court of the State of California
State parks of California
commons:Category:State parks of California
State prisons of California
State Senate of California
Statutes of California
Structures in California
commons:Category:Buildings and structures in California
Superfund sites in California
Supreme Court of the State of California
Symbols of the state of California
:Category:Symbols of California
commons:Category:Symbols of California

T
Telecommunications in California
commons:Category:Communications in California
Telephone area codes in California
Television shows set in California
Television stations in California
The Californias, 1770–1804
Theatres in California
commons:Category:Theatres in California
Tourism in California  website
commons:Category:Tourism in California
Transportation in California
:Category:Transportation in California
commons:Category:Transport in California
Treaty of Guadalupe Hidalgo of 1848

U
Ultra prominent peaks of California
United States of America
States of the United States of America
United States census statistical areas of California
United States congressional delegations from California
United States congressional districts in California
United States Court of Appeals for the Ninth Circuit
United States District Court for the Central District of California
United States District Court for the Eastern District of California
United States District Court for the Northern District of California
United States District Court for the Southern District of California
United States representatives from California
United States senators from California
Universities and colleges in California
commons:Category:Universities and colleges in California
US-CA – ISO 3166-2:US region code for the State of California
USS California

V
Vallejo, California, state capital 1852-1853

W
Water parks in California
Waterfalls of California
commons:Category:Waterfalls of California
Western Manufactured Housing Communities Association
Wikimedia
Wikimedia Commons:Category:California
commons:Category:Maps of California
Wikinews:Category:California
Wikinews:Portal:California
Wikipedia Category:California
Wikipedia Portal:California
Wind power in California

X
 Xavier College Preparatory High School (California)

Y
 Yuha Desert

Z
Zoos in California
commons:Category:Zoos in California

See also

Topic overview:
California
Outline of California

 
Indexes of topics by U.S. state